In Tibetan cuisine, gundain is a type of pastry made from barley grain and yeast (fermented into a light barley beer), with tsampa, dry curd cheese, wild ginseng, and brown sugar. This pastry is often served during the Tibetan New Year and Losar as a starter.

See also
 List of Tibetan dishes

References

Tibetan pastries